Argo Arbeiter (born 5 December 1973) is an Estonian football manager and former Estonian international footballer. Currently he is the sporting director of Nõmme Kalju.

International career
Arbeiter earned a total number of 29 caps for the Estonia national football team during his career, scoring six goals. He scored four goals in a single halftime in a friendly against Andorra on 13 November 1996.

Career statistics

International goals
Score and result list Estonia's goal tally first.

Honours

Individual
 Estonian Silverball: 1996

References

External links

1973 births
Living people
Sportspeople from Viljandi
Estonian footballers
Estonia international footballers
Association football forwards
Viljandi JK Tulevik players
FC Flora players
FCI Levadia Tallinn players
Estonian expatriate footballers
Expatriate footballers in Finland
Estonian expatriate sportspeople in Finland
FC Flora managers
Veikkausliiga players
Kotkan Työväen Palloilijat players
FCI Levadia U21 managers
Estonian football managers
Estonian expatriate football managers
Meistriliiga players